Floratone is the first album by the collective Floratone, which comprises guitarist Bill Frisell, drummer Matt Chamberlain along with producers Lee Townsend and Tucker Martine which was released on the Blue Note label in 2007.

Reception

In his review for Allmusic, Sean Westergaard notes that, "It's great to hear Frisell messing with the delays again in a big way and the pure sonics of Floratone are as much of a treat as the playing. It's pleasant enough for background music, but careful listening will be rewarded. Try this one with headphones". On All About Jazz, John Kelman said "The music on Floratone is largely based around Chamberlain's behind-the-beat grooves and Frisell's left-of-center blues-drenched chords and phrases. While changes don't figure much, Frisell's inherently skewed lyricism creates instantly memorable melodies. As is often the case with Frisell, it's not about soloing per se; rather it's about collective interpretation—and Frisell's ability to work simple ideas, exploring all possible nuances". The BBC Music review by Matt Trustram stated "The lack of an instrumentalist leader is audible; don’t expect virtuosic riffing or soloing from Frisell here. Sure, his presence is felt, with hallmark reverb and tremolo effects as well as his innate blues feel".

Track listing
All compositions by Bill Frisell, Matt Chamberlain, Lee Townsend and Tucker Martine
 "Floratone" – 5:31
 "The Wanderer" – 6:39
 "Mississippi Rising" – 4:26
 "The Passenger" – 6:56
 "Swamped" – 3:34
 "Monsoon" – 4:59
 "Louisiana Lowboat" – 4:01
 "The Future" – 4:25
 "Take a Look" – 2:02
 "Frontiers" – 4:05
 "Threadbare" – 1:41

Personnel
Bill Frisell – electric guitar, acoustic guitar, loops, vocals
Matt Chamberlain – drums, percussion, loops
Lee Townsend, Tucker Martine – production 
Viktor Krauss – electric bass, acoustic bass
Ron Miles – cornet (tracks 1–3, 7 & 8)
Eyvind Kang – viola (tracks 1–3, 7 & 8)

References 

Blue Note Records albums
Bill Frisell albums
2007 albums